The Boletin latinoamericano y del caribe de plantas medicinales y aromaticas (English: Latin American and Caribbean Bulletin of Medicinal and Aromatic Plants) is a bimonthly peer-reviewed scientific journal covering research on all aspects of medicinal and aromatic plants. Articles are published in Spanish or English.

History 
The journal was established in 2002 as a communication tool to keep the Latin-American community informed on events and news related to medicinal and aromatic plants taking place around the world. This primary objective is still achieved by means of the so-called "supplements" issued in between each bulletin. The official launch of the publication took place in Buenos Aires, Argentina, during the first Latin-American Congress of Phytochemistry.

The journal started to publish scientific contributions during its second year of publication. In 2007, the journal officially changed from a newsletter format to a more traditional journal format, typically publishing more than five original papers per issue. Articles are published under a Creative Commons Attribution license and access to its repository is free.

Annual meetings 
Congreso Latinoamericano de Plantas Medicinales

See also 
 Ethnobotany

External links 
 

Pharmacognosy
Pharmacology journals
Botany journals
Multilingual journals
Bimonthly journals
Publications established in 2002
Creative Commons-licensed journals
Latin America and the Caribbean